The 1860 Open Championship was a golf competition held at Prestwick Golf Club, in Ayrshire, Scotland. It is now regarded as the first Open Championship. Until his death in 1859, Allan Robertson was regarded as top golfer in the world. The Open Championship was created to determine his successor. Eight golfers contested the event, with Willie Park, Sr. winning the championship by 2 shots from Tom Morris, Sr.

Prestwick Golf Club organised the event, "to be played for by professional golfers". Golf clubs in Scotland and England were invited to name and send up to three of their best players to compete. The contest was over three rounds of the twelve-hole links course. The prize for winning was the Challenge Belt; a player winning the belt three successive years would keep it. "Cawdies, i.e. Professional Players, not Keepers of Links" were eligible and had to produce a certificate of respectability from their club. George Daniel Brown was the only Englishman to play in the event.

James Ogilvie Fairlie was the principal organizer of this inaugural Open Championship. In a proposed competition for a "Challenge Belt", Fairlie sent out a series of letters to Aberdeen, Blackheath, Bruntsfield, Carnoustie Panmure, Dirleton Castle, Innerleven, Montrose, North Berwick, Perth, Musselburgh and St. Andrews (as noted in Prestwick Golf Club Archive), inviting a player known as a "respectable caddie" to represent each of the clubs in a tournament to be held on 17 October 1860.

The pairings were Tom Morris, Sr. (Prestwick) and Robert Andrew (Perth), Willie Park Sr. (Musselburgh) and Alexander Smith (Bruntsfield), William Steel (Bruntsfield) and Charlie Hunter (Prestwick St Nicholas), George Daniel Brown (Blackheath) and Andrew Strath (St Andrews).

Course

Final leaderboard
Source:

See also
Golf in Scotland

References

External links
Prestwick 1860 (Official site)

The Open Championship
Golf tournaments in Scotland
Sport in South Ayrshire
History of South Ayrshire
Open Championship
Open Championship
Open Championship